Ardun can refer to:

Places in Iran
"Ardun" may refer to:
 Ardun, Isfahan
 Ardun, Yazd

Other uses
 Ardun Mechanical Corporation, Zora Arkus-Duntov's engineering company